Claudia Nicole Torres García (born 28 February 2000) is a Dominican footballer who plays as a goalkeeper for American college Bridgeport Purple Knights and the Dominican Republic national team.

International career
Torres has appeared for the Dominican Republic at the 2020 CONCACAF Women's Olympic Qualifying Championship qualification.

References

External links

2000 births
Living people
Sportspeople from Santo Domingo
Dominican Republic women's footballers
Women's association football goalkeepers
Bridgeport Purple Knights women's soccer players
Dominican Republic women's international footballers
Dominican Republic expatriate women's footballers
Dominican Republic expatriate sportspeople in the United States
Expatriate women's soccer players in the United States